General Bullock may refer to:

George Bullock (British Army officer) (1851–1926), British Army lieutenant general
Robert Bullock (1828–1905), Confederate States Army brigadier general

See also
Attorney General Bullock (disambiguation)